The men's marathon event at the 2017 Summer Universiade was held on 26 August at the Ren' ai Road, Taipei City and start at Ketagalan Boulevard.

Record

Results

References 

Roller sports at the 2017 Summer Universiade